Otto Schönthal (10 August 1878 – 31 December 1961) was an Austrian architect. His work was part of the architecture event in the art competition at the 1928 Summer Olympics.

Gallery

References

1878 births
1961 deaths
20th-century Austrian architects
Olympic competitors in art competitions
Architects from Vienna